Michael Paul Montgomery (born July 1, 1989) is an American professional baseball pitcher for the Acereros de Monclova of the Mexican League. He was drafted by the Kansas City Royals in the first round of the 2008 MLB draft, and made his Major League Baseball (MLB) debut with the Seattle Mariners in 2015. The Mariners traded him to the Chicago Cubs in 2016. Montgomery recorded the final out in Game 7 of the 2016 World Series, earning the save and sealing the Cubs' first World Series title since 1908.

Professional career

Kansas City Royals
Montgomery was selected by the Kansas City Royals in the first round, with the 36th selection, of the 2008 MLB draft out of William S. Hart High School in Santa Clarita, California. In 2012, he posted a combined record of 5–12 in 27 starts while splitting the season between the Royals' Double A and Triple A clubs.  On November 20, 2012, the Royals added Montgomery to the 40-man roster in anticipation of the upcoming Rule 5 Draft of Minor League players.

Tampa Bay Rays
On December 9, 2012, Montgomery was traded to the Tampa Bay Rays (along with Jake Odorizzi, Patrick Leonard, and Wil Myers) in exchange for James Shields and Wade Davis. He was optioned to AAA on March 11, 2013.

Seattle Mariners
On March 31, 2015, Montgomery was traded to the Seattle Mariners for Erasmo Ramírez. After an injury sidelined James Paxton, the Mariners called Montgomery up to the majors for the first time on June 2, 2015. He started that night against the New York Yankees at Safeco Field, giving up one run, four hits, and walking two while striking out four and leaving after six innings with a 2–1 lead. He was on track to earn his first major league win, but the Mariners  lost the game.

On June 23, 2015, Montgomery became the first Mariners left-handed pitcher to ever throw a complete game shutout with 10 strikeouts and no walks, getting the win against the Kansas City Royals 7–0. Following his first career complete game shutout, Montgomery pitched his second consecutive shutout on June 30, 2015. He allowed one hit, a double in the 7th inning, to the San Diego Padres in a 5–0 win. He is the first Mariners pitcher since Freddy García in 2001 to throw  complete game shutouts in consecutive starts.

On August 30, 2015, Montgomery was sent back down to the Tacoma Rainiers. He made the Mariners' opening day roster in 2016 as a reliever.

Chicago Cubs
On July 20, 2016, the Seattle Mariners traded Montgomery and prospect Jordan Pries to the Chicago Cubs for prospects Daniel Vogelbach and Paul Blackburn. After allowing a three-run home run to the first batter he faced as a Cub, Montgomery performed well during the remainder of the season. He pitched in 17 games (including five starts), with a 2.82 ERA with the Cubs.

Montgomery had a strong postseason performance in 2016, playing an instrumental role in the team's championship run. Cumulatively he went 1-1, including 11 appearances,  innings pitched, and a 3.14 ERA. Most notably, Montgomery relieved Carl Edwards Jr. in the bottom of the 10th inning in Game 7 of the World Series. With a runner on first base and two outs in a one-run game, he finished the game with a ground out to third base. Montgomery earned his first career save, winning the World Series for the Chicago Cubs for the first time in 108 years.

In 2017, Montgomery made 44 appearances (14 starts), and a 3.38 ERA for the season. His record was 7-8, along with three saves. His performance through mid-May was exceptional, with his ERA dropping to 1.08. After gradually rising to 4.01 in mid-July, it leveled out in the remainder of the season. Montgomery hit his first career home run off Atlanta Braves pitcher R. A. Dickey on July 19.

In contrast with his 2016 performance, Montgomery struggled in the 2017 post-season. Between the division series against the Washington Nationals and the league championship series against the Los Angeles Dodgers, Montgomery had five appearances and  innings pitched. He allowed three home runs, finishing with a 16.62 postseason ERA.

In 2018, Montgomery had a 5-6 record with a 3.99 ERA in 124 innings. He started the 2019 season with a 1-2 record and a 5.67 ERA in 27 innings.

Kansas City Royals (second stint)
On July 15, 2019, it was reported that Montgomery had been traded back to the Royals, with the Cubs receiving catcher Martín Maldonado in exchange. Despite Montgomery being primarily a reliever and spot starter during his major league career, the Royals used him exclusively as a starting pitcher. He made 13 starts and pitched 64 innings while winning two games and losing seven. With the 2020 Kansas City Royals, Montgomery appeared in 3 games, compiling a 0-0 record with 5.06 ERA and 4 strikeouts in 5.1 innings pitched. On October 30, 2020, Montgomery was outrighted off the Royals roster and became a free agent instead of accepting a Triple-A assignment.

New York Mets

On February 14, 2021, Montgomery signed a minor league contract with the New York Mets with an invitation to spring training. On March 28, 2021, Montgomery was released by the Mets.

New York Yankees
On April 5, 2021, Montgomery signed a minor league contract with the New York Yankees organization. On June 1, Montgomery opted out of his minor league contract and became a free agent. He had recorded a 7.56 ERA in 4 games for the Triple-A Scranton/Wilkes-Barre RailRiders.

Samsung Lions
On June 1, 2021, Montgomery agreed to a contract with the Samsung Lions of the KBO League. During a game on September 10, Montgomery was warned about the league's 12-second pitch rule and subsequently ejected. In response to his ejection, Montgomery struck an umpire with a rosin bag, and threw his uniform on the field of play before retreating to the clubhouse. Montgomery was not re-signed for the 2022 season and became a free agent.

New York Mets (second stint)
On March 15, 2022, Montgomery signed a minor league contract to return to the New York Mets. He made 22 appearances (17 starts) for the Triple-A Syracuse Mets, struggling to a 2-10 record and 6.72 ERA with 54 strikeouts in 69.2 innings pitched. He elected free agency on November 10, 2022.

Acereros de Monclova
On February 2, 2023, Montgomery signed with the Acereros de Monclova of the Mexican League.

Personal life
Montgomery and his wife, Stephanie, were married in August 2018 during a Cubs off-day. Their first child, a son, was born April 2019.

References

External links

1989 births
Living people
Sportspeople from Santa Clarita, California
Baseball players from California
Major League Baseball pitchers
KBO League pitchers
Seattle Mariners players
Chicago Cubs players
Kansas City Royals players
Samsung Lions players
Arizona League Royals players
Burlington Bees players
Wilmington Blue Rocks players
Northwest Arkansas Naturals players
Omaha Storm Chasers players
Charlotte Stone Crabs players
Durham Bulls players
Tacoma Rainiers players
Scranton/Wilkes-Barre RailRiders players
Surprise Rafters players
Salt River Rafters players
American expatriate baseball players in South Korea
People from Valencia, Santa Clarita, California